Harkey is a surname. Notable people with the surname include:

Bob Harkey (1930–2016), American racing driver
Cory Harkey (born 1990), American football player
Diane Harkey (born 1951), American politician
Ira B. Harkey Jr. (1918–2006), American journalist and writer
Lem Harkey (1934–2004), American football player
Mike Harkey (born 1966), American baseball player
Steve Harkey (born 1949), American football player